Monday Night at the Village Gate is a live album by American jazz flutist Herbie Mann recorded at The Village Gate in 1965 and released on the Atlantic label the following year. The album follows Mann's two previously released recordings from the venue five years earlier Herbie Mann at the Village Gate and Herbie Mann Returns to the Village Gate. An additional track from the concert was released on Standing Ovation at Newport.

Reception

AllMusic awarded the album 4 stars with its review noting "Mann's music was still based on the Latin jazz that he had spent years exploring, but rather than the frenetic beats of Afro-Cuban music or samba, the rhythmic pulse of these five tracks is decidedly more laid-back".

Track listing
 "Away from the Crowd" (Attila Zoller) - 6:41
 "Motherless Child" (Traditional) - 8:04
 "In Escambrun" (Zoller) - 5:40
 "The Young Turks" (Arif Mardin) - 5:24
 "You're Gonna Make It With Me" (Jack Hitchcock) - 6:47

Personnel 
Herbie Mann - flute
Jack Hitchcock, Mark Weinstein - trombone
Dave Pike - vibraphone
Chick Corea - piano 
Earl May - bass
Bruno Carr - drums
Carlos "Patato" Valdes - congas

References 

1966 live albums
Herbie Mann live albums
Atlantic Records live albums
Albums recorded at the Village Gate
Albums produced by Nesuhi Ertegun